1863 in archaeology

Explorations
 Édouard Lartet and Henry Christy begin joint exploration of caves in the valley of the Vézère, in southern France.

Excavations
 Excavations at Ephesus by John Turtle Wood begin.
 William Copeland Borlase supervises excavations of the re-discovered prehistoric settlement and fogou at Carn Euny in Cornwall.

Publications
 Samuel Ferguson's Ogham Inscriptions in Ireland, Wales and Scotland is published posthumously.
 The text of the Iguvine Tablets (3rd–1st centuries BC) is first published, by Francis William Newman in London.
 Zeitschrift für ägyptisches Sprache und Altertumskunde begins publication.

Finds
 April 15 – Winged Victory of Samothrace found at Samothrace by Charles Champoiseau. Made c.190 BC, it is now in the Musée du Louvre, Paris.
 April 20 – Augustus of Prima Porta in the Villa of Livia at Prima Porta, near Rome.
 Nydam Boats found in Denmark by Conrad Engelhardt.
 Early human jawbone found in proximity to flint tools at Moulin Quignon in France by Jacques Boucher de Crèvecœur de Perthes, subsequently considered a hoax perpetrated by one of his diggers.

Awards

Miscellaneous
 Anthropological Society of London formed

Births
 July 4 – Hugo Winckler, German Assyriologist (died 1913)
 July 13 – Margaret Murray, Anglo-Indian Egyptologist (died 1963)
 Francis Joseph Bigger, Irish antiquarian (died 1926)

Deaths
 July 3 – Alexander Henry Rhind, Scottish Egyptologist (born 1833)

See also
 List of years in archaeology
 1862 in archaeology
 1864 in archaeology

References

Archaeology
Archaeology by year
Archaeology
Archaeology